William Roche may refer to:

 William Roche (Nova Scotia politician) (1842–1925), Canadian politician in Halifax, Nova Scotia
 William Roche (rugby player) (1895–1983), Irish rugby union player
 William James Roche (1859–1937), Canadian politician and Conservative Member of Parliament for the Manitoba riding of Marquette
 William Roche (mayor), Lord Mayor of London
 William Roche (Irish politician) (1775-1850), Member of the UK Parliament for Limerick City

See also 

 William Roach (disambiguation)